Events in the year 1991 in Switzerland.

Incumbents
Federal Council:
Otto Stich 
Jean-Pascal Delamuraz 
Kaspar Villiger
Arnold Koller 
Flavio Cotti (President)
René Felber 
Adolf Ogi

Births

 5 February - Anthony Sauthier.
 17 August - Steven Zuber.
 2 December - Elisa Gasparin.

Deaths

 2 March - Josef Stalder.
 13 June - Loulou Boulaz.
 30 August - Jean Tinguely.
 25 September - Anita Traversi.

References

 
Years of the 20th century in Switzerland
1990s in Switzerland